The 2008–09 SEB Korvpalli Meistriliiga is the 18th season of the Estonian basketball league and the fifth under the title sponsorship of SEB. Including the competition's previous incarnations, this is the 84th season of the Estonian men's basketball league. TÜ/Rock came into the season as defending champions of the 2007–08 KML season.

The season started on 15 October 2008 and concluded on 1 June 2009 with Kalev/Cramo defeating TÜ/Rock 4 games to 2 in the 2009 KML Finals to win their 3rd Estonian League title.

Teams

Regular season

League table

Updated to match(es) played on 1 June 2009. Source: KML (2008/2009)

Playoffs
The playoffs began on 23 April 2009 and ended on 1 June 2009. The tournament concluded with Kalev/Cramo defeating TÜ/Rock 4 games to 2 in the 2009 KML Finals.

Bracket

Individual statistics
Players qualify to this category by having at least 50% games played.

Points

Rebounds

Assists

Awards

Finals MVP
  Kristjan Kangur (Kalev/Cramo)

External links
 Korvpalli Meistriliiga

References

Korvpalli Meistriliiga seasons
Estonian
KML